João Silva or  da Silva may refer to:

 João Silva (footballer, born 1926), Portuguese footballer
 João Silva (photographer) (born 1966), Portuguese journalist and photographer based in South Africa
 João Pedro Silva (triathlete) (born 1989), competitor in the ITU World Championship Series competitions
 João Silva (footballer, born 1990), Portuguese footballer
 João Luiz Ferreira da Silva (born 1981), Brazilian footballer known as Preto
 João Batista da Silva (born 1955), Brazilian football defender
 João Batista da Silva (athlete) (born 1963), Brazilian sprint athlete
 Jô (João Alves de Assis Silva, born 1987), Brazilian footballer
 Almeida Garrett (João Baptista da Silva Leitão de Almeida Garrett, 1799–1854), Portuguese poet, playwright, novelist and politician
 João Carlos Marinho Silva (born 1935), Brazilian writer
 João Domingos da Silva Pinto (born 1961), Portuguese footballer and manager
 João J. R. Fraústo da Silva (born 1933), Portuguese chemist
 João Marques da Silva Oliveira (1853–1927), Portuguese painter 
 João da Silva (boxer) (born 1946), Brazilian Olympic boxer
 João Silva (footballer, born 1998), Portuguese footballer
 João Pedro Silva (handballer), Brazilian handballer
 Joao Silva (footballer, born 1997), Brazilian footballer
 João Silva (footballer, born 1999), Portuguese footballer